Doggone Cats (reissued as Dog Gone Cats), is a 1947 Warner Bros. Merrie Melodies cartoon directed by Arthur Davis. The short was released on October 25, 1947, and stars Sylvester.

Plot
Wellington the dog is given a package to deliver to Uncle Louie, with strict instructions not to let go of it. Sylvester and his unnamed brother both of whom Wellington has been tormenting, see this as their chance to get even. They try multiple ways to get him to drop the package (one of which is disguising a cigarette from pepper and using it to make him sneeze), but Wellington always outsmarts them. 

Besides repeatedly filching the package, at one point they drop a duplicate off a bridge. Wellington still manages to retrieve the package a few times, but never for as long as he hopes for. At the end of the cartoon, Wellington finally arrives at Uncle Louie's, but is upset when he finds out that the package contains dinner for the two cats. Realizing that he had been a "jackass" through the whole thing, Wellington slams his head against the mailbox and crowns himself with garbage can lids.

See also
 Looney Tunes and Merrie Melodies filmography (1940–1949)

References

External links
 

1947 animated films
1947 short films
1947 films
1940s Warner Bros. animated short films
Merrie Melodies short films
Films directed by Arthur Davis
Cinecolor films
Films scored by Carl Stalling
Sylvester the Cat films
Animated films about brothers
Animated films about dogs